Neil Winstanley (born 25 August 1976) is a South African former soccer player who played as a defender. He represented South Africa at the 2004 African Nations Cup.

External links

1976 births
Living people
South African soccer players
South African twins
Bidvest Wits F.C. players
Kaizer Chiefs F.C. players
Mamelodi Sundowns F.C. players
Association football defenders
Soccer players from Johannesburg
White South African people
South Africa international soccer players
2004 African Cup of Nations players
Twin sportspeople